Sylvain is the French form of Silvanus.  It may refer to:

People
Sylvain Archambault, Canadian director
Sylvain Bied (1965–2011), French footballer and manager
Sylvain Cappell (born 1946), American mathematician
Sylvain Chavanel (born 1979), French cyclist
Sylvain Chomet (born 1963), French animator
Sylvain Cossette (born 1963), Canadian pop vocalist
Sylvain Côté (born 1966), Canadian former ice hockey player
Sylvain Cros (born 1980), French freestyle swimmer
Sylvain Distin (born 1977), French footballer
Sylvan Ebanks-Blake (born 1986), British footballer
Sylvain Eugène Raynal (1867–1939), French army officer
Sylvain Estibal (born 1967), French journalist, writer, and film director
Sylvain Garel (born 1956), French politician and human-rights activist
Sylvain Grenier (born 1977), Canadian wrestler
Sylvain Guintoli (born 1982), French motorcycle racer
Sylvain Arend (1902–1992), Belgian astronomer
Sylvain Lefebvre (born 1967), former NHL player
Sylvain Légaré (born 1970), Canadian politician
Sylvain Longchambon (born 1980), French ice dancer
Sylvain Maréchal (1750–1803), French essayist
Sylvain Neuvel (born 1973), Canadian science fiction author
Sylvain Remy (born 1980), Beninese footballer
Sylvain Richard (born 1979), French rapper, disc jockey, and producer known as 20syl
Sylvain Sylvain (born 1951), guitarist
Sylvain Templier (born 1971), French politician
Sylvain Turgeon (born 1965), Canadian former NHL player
Sylvain Wiltord (born 1974), French footballer

Fictional Characters
Sylvain Jose Gautier, a fictional character from the video games Fire Emblem: Three Houses and Fire Emblem Warriors: Three Hopes

See also
Silvain (disambiguation), variant spelling
Saint-Sylvain (disambiguation)
Sylvan (disambiguation)

French masculine given names